Bhawanipatna railway station was located in Kalahandi district of Odisha State.

History

The proposal for Lanjigarh–Junagarh line came in 1991, when Bhakta Charan Das was the state railway minister. This line was announced in Railway Budget 1992. After nearly twenty years later this line was completed in 2011. After then Bhawanipatna railway station was opened by former State railway minister Bhakta charan das on 11 August 2012. On the same day, the first train Bhawanipatna–Bhubaneshwar link express started from Bhawanipatna. A Passenger train was extended to Bhawanipatna from Kesinga on 12 August 2012.

Important trains

 18437 / 18438 – Bhubaneswar–Junagarh Express
 58207 / 58208 – Raipur–Bhawanipatna Passenger
 58303 / 58304 – SAMBALPUR–JUNAGARH ROAD Passenger

References

Sambalpur railway division
Railway stations in Kalhandi district
Railway stations opened in 2012